The Wauhatchie Pike is a historic path in Lookout Mountain, Tennessee, U.S.. It was named after Wauhatchie, a Cherokee Nation chieftain. The path was an important location during the American Civil War of 1861–1865. It has been listed on the National Register of Historic Places since July 11, 2001.

References

Roads on the National Register of Historic Places in Tennessee
National Register of Historic Places in Hamilton County, Tennessee
Buildings and structures completed in 1863
Hamilton County, Tennessee